SS Santa Elisa was a refrigerated cargo ship built for the United States Maritime Commission by Federal Shipbuilding of Kearny, New Jersey in 1941.

Operated by the Grace Line, Santa Elisa was a member of Convoy WS 21S from Newport, England, for Malta as a part of Operation Pedestal. MAS 557 strafed the vessel with her .51 Breda machine gun, killing four British army gunners, while the second motorboat launched a 450 mm torpedo that struck Santa Elisa on the starboard side near the No. 1 cargo hatch at about 05:17. The ship's cargo of aviation gasoline burst into flames.

Santa Elisa eventually sank at approximately 07:17 on 13 August near position , and 28 survivors, including Francis A. Dales who was awarded the Merchant Marine Distinguished Service Medal for his involvement in the convoy, were rescued by HMS Penn and landed at Malta. After the Santa Elisa'''s sinking, Dales and Larsen volunteered to board the damaged SS Ohio and helped defend it against further attacked until the Ohio reached Malta on 16 August 1942 suspended between the British destroyers Bramham and Penn''. The award was given by Admiral Emory S. Land.

Notes

References 
 
 
 
 
 

Type C2-G ships
Ships built in Kearny, New Jersey
1941 ships
World War II merchant ships of the United States
World War II shipwrecks in the Mediterranean Sea
Maritime incidents in August 1942